Gillenwater is a surname. Notable people with the surname include:

 Carden Gillenwater (1918–2000), American Major League Baseball player
 Claral Gillenwater (1900–1978), American Major League Baseball player
 James R. Gillenwater (1871–1946), American Medal of Honor recipient
 Jay Y. Gillenwater, co-discoverer of Schmitt Gillenwater Kelly syndrome, a genetic disease